The CFL-Dosto is the name for three series of Double-deck coaches by Bombardier for Luxembourg CFL. In various lengths, they form a Push-pull train with 3000 and 4000-locomotives.

Interior

Rolling stock of Luxembourg
Train-related introductions in 2005